Jeannette is a city in Westmoreland County, Pennsylvania, United States. Jeannette was founded in 1888. The city got its name from one of the original city fathers, who wished to honor his wife, Jeannette McLaughlin, by giving the new town her first name: Jeannette. The city celebrated its 125th anniversary in July 2013. The population was 9,654 according to the 2010 census.

Geography
Jeannette is located at  (40.328773, -79.613997).

Demographics

 
As of the census of 2010, there were 9,654 people, 4,630 households, and 2,949 families residing in the city. The population density was 4,414.3 people per square mile (1,706.9/km2). There were 5,139 housing units at an average density of 2,129.3 per square mile (823.3/km2). The racial makeup of the city was 77.81% white, 20.19% African American, 0.08% Native American, 0.09% Asian, 0.04% Pacific Islander, 0.20% from other races, and 1.60% from two or more races. Hispanic or Latino of any race were 0.50% of the population.

There were 4,630 households, out of which 26.7% had children under the age of 18 living with them, 45.3% were married couples living together, 14.9% had a female householder with no husband present, and 36.3% were non-families. 32.4% of all households were made up of individuals, and 15.9% had someone living alone who was 65 years of age or older. The average household size was 2.29 and the average family size was 2.89.

In the city, the population was spread out, with 22.1% under the age of 18, 7.4% from 18 to 24, 28.4% from 25 to 44, 22.2% from 45 to 64, and 20.0% who were 65 years of age or older. The median age was 40 years. For every 100 females, there were 87.6 males. For every 100 females age 18 and over, there were 83.5 males.

The median income for a household in the city in 2011 was $31,498. The median income for a family was $37, 038. Males had a median income of $32,413 versus $21,702 for females. The per capita income for the city was $15,961. About 10.9% of families and 15.0% of the population were below the poverty line, including 21.2% of those under age 18 and 13.2% of those age 65 or over.

Civic life

City government and services
Jeannette maintains a Police Department, a Fire Department, a Public Library, a Parks and Recreation department, and a department of Public Works.
Parks and Recreation - this department maintains eight parks which variously include playgrounds, ball fields, and basketball courts (open on a daily basis from dawn until dusk).
Waste Management - the city operates two refuse trucks daily, covering residential and commercial accounts, five days a week. Commercial accounts are served on a pre-set schedule, either daily or as needed.

Public safety and living standards
Crime - Jeannette's crime rate as of 2011 included 196.2 (per 100,000) for burglary, and 505.9 (per 100,000) for theft. 
Recycling - is mandatory in Jeannette.
Community Development - the city employs a Coordinator and staff to assist residents.

Religious life
In 1943, the city went before the Supreme Court to defend an ordinance that banned distributing religious materials door to door.  Several members of the Jehovah's Witnesses challenged the constitutionality of the law but were defeated in Douglas v. City of Jeannette.

Education
Jeannette City School District includes McKee Elementary School and Jeannette Junior/Senior High School.

History
Perhaps the oldest historical reference to the area that became Jeannette is the role the area played in the Pontiac War in 1763.  The Bushy Run Battlefield marks the spot where Colonel Henry Boquet led the British and American troops to defeat the Indians in a battle on the 5th and 6 August that year.  This victory is credited with helping to prevent the capture of Fort Pitt, and it served the purpose of reopening communication and supply lines.  Today, this  historical landmark is the site of a museum, nature trails, picnic areas, and an annual reenactment of the Battle of Bushy Run.

First incorporated as a borough on June 7, 1889, Jeannette earned the nickname as "the glass city" in recognition of the numerous glass plants founded in the area, with those factories contributing to the city's original stature as the first large manufacturing town in Westmoreland County.  In fact, the impact of the glass industry was so significant that the city's name actually comes from Jeannette E. Hartupee McKee, the wife of H. Sellers McKee, a local industrialist who cofounded the Chambers and McKee Glass Works and was a member of the elite South Fork Fishing and Hunting Club of Johnstown Flood fame.  Mckee and his partner J.A. Chambers also have the distinction of naming Jeannette's main street, Clay Avenue after their financial backer, Richard W. Clay.  On January 1, 1938, Jeannette became a third class city with Attorney John M. OConnell as the first mayor.

At times, there were as many as 7 significant factories operating in the city of Jeannette including some of the most well known in the history of the glass industry.   Names like Jeannette Glass; Fort Pitt Glass; the Pittsburgh Lamp, Brass and Glass Company; American-Saint Gobain, Westmoreland Glass; and others all supplied the country with everything from plate glass windows, to bottles, to milk glass, and much more for many decades.  Some estimates over the years indicate that Jeannette once produced somewhere between 70 and 85% of the world's glass.  Unfortunately, Jeannette's glass industry was one of the early United States industry victims of cheap, foreign competition that made it less expensive to produce glass overseas and today only two glass factories remain in the city.

Jeannette's manufacturing history doesn't end with the glass industry.  Today's Elliott Company represents an evolution dating back to 1914 when William Swan Elliott moved his company to Jeannette.  The Elliott Company, owned by the Carrier Corporation from 1957 until 1979 and by United Technologies Corporation until a 1987 buyout that returned the company to a privately owned status, only to become an Ebara Corporation subsidiary in 2000, has always had a solid reputation in the dynamo, turbine, and large rotating equipment industry.  In 1952, the company produced the first diesel-engine turbocharger used in a racecar and subsequently built more than 40,000 more of them for other diesel applications.  Throughout the 1970s, local residents routinely witnessed a revolving door of trains hauling parts into the plant on North 4th Street and hauling the huge turbine engines back down the tracks. Today, the Elliott Company is the city's largest employer.  Jeannette is also the manufacturing home of Jensen Steam Engine Mfg. Co., Inc., which produces small working models of steam engines and turbines.  The Jensen shop is only a few blocks from the Elliott plant.

In 2018, the Elliott Company was approved to purchase the former Jeannette Glass site and expand their operations to downtown Jeannette. The facility could become operational by 2020.

The Pennsylvania Rubber Works, which moved to Jeannette from Erie, Pennsylvania, around 1903, was yet another key part of the city's significant industrial base.  Not only did this factory become a significant supplier of play balls (basketballs, footballs, tennis balls, etc.) and carpet underlay as part of General Tire in its later years; but the original Pennsylvania Rubber Works provided products for Jeeps and gas masks during World War II.

Notable people 
 Steve August, NFL offensive tackle for Seattle Seahawks (1977–84) and Pittsburgh Steelers (1984)
 Karen D. Beyer, former State Representative for the 131st district in the Lehigh Valley
 Buster Clarkson, Negro league baseball player, lived in Jeannette after he retired
 Demetrious Cox, American football player
 Claire Cribbs, two-time All-American basketball player at the University of Pittsburgh (1933–34 and 1934–35)
 Ambrose Battista De Paoli, Roman Catholic Archbishop and nuncio
 Frank Fitzsimmons, president of International Brotherhood of Teamsters 1967–1981, born in Jeannette
 Mike Getto, All-American football player at the University of Pittsburgh and football coach for the National Football League's Brooklyn Dodgers (1942)
 Monica Lee Gradischek, voice actress
 Slide Hampton, jazz trombonist, born in Jeannette
 Dick Hoak, former Pittsburgh Steelers running back (1969–70) and running backs coach (1972–2006), born in Jeannette
 Jack G. Merrell, United States Air Force four-star general
 Vaughn Monroe, 1940s–1950s bandleader, singer and actor; attended high school in Jeannette
 Marissa Moss, author of more than a dozen children's books who was born in Jeannette and moved to California at age 2
 Neon Swing X-perience, swing band
 Terrelle Pryor, former high school quarterback for Jeannette Jayhawks, starting quarterback for Ohio State Buckeyes, and NFL quarterback and wide receiver
 William A. Shomo, ace fighter pilot and World War II Medal of Honor recipient
 LaMont "ShowBoat" Robinson, former high school basketball player for Jeannette Jayhawks, College Kankakee Community College 1981–82, Central State Univ (1986–87) USBL Knights (1988)  Meadowlark Lemon Harlem All-Star, Washington Generals team that plays the Harlem Globetrotters (tour to Russia 1989)  (1988-1994) Harlem Road Kings, (1995-2009) Harlem Clowns (2010-Present) Robinson has also been nonmined to the Naismith Memorial Basketball Hall of Fame in 2018 and 2019. Founder the National Rhythm & Blues Hall of Fame in Detroit, Michigan.

References  

Cities in Pennsylvania
Cities in Westmoreland County, Pennsylvania
Populated places established in 1888
Pittsburgh metropolitan area